The following is a list of symbols of the U.S. state of Alaska found in the Alaska Statutes.

Insignia

Flora

Fauna

Geology

Miscellaneous

Related
Not defined by Alaska statutes:

See also
 List of Alaska-related topics
 Lists of United States state insignia
 State of Alaska

References

External links
  

State symbols
Alaska